Two Sides of the Moon is the only solo album by English rock musician Keith Moon, drummer for the Who. It peaked at No. 155 on the Billboard 200. The album title was credited to Ringo Starr. Rather than using the album as a chance to showcase his drumming skill, Moon sang lead vocals on all tracks, and played drums only on three of the tracks ("Crazy Like a Fox", "The Kids Are Alright" and "Move Over Ms. L"), although he played percussion on "Don't Worry Baby". The album features contributions from Ringo Starr, Harry Nilsson, Joe Walsh of the Eagles, Jim Keltner, Bobby Keys, Klaus Voormann, John Sebastian, Flo & Eddie (Mark Volman and Howard Kaylan of The Turtles), Spencer Davis, Dick Dale, Suzi Quatro's sister Patti Quatro, Patti's bandmates from Fanny Jean Millington and Nickey Barclay, and future actor Miguel Ferrer.

Background
Moon was the last member of the Who to release a solo album: by this point, John Entwistle had released Smash Your Head Against the Wall (with Moon playing percussion and singing backing vocals), Roger Daltrey released his hit album Daltrey (1973), and Pete Townshend had produced several Meher Baba tribute albums and the demo compilation Who Came First.

Moon had moved into the Beverly Wilshire Hotel with assistant Dougal Butler in March 1974, to play on the sessions for Harry Nilsson's Pussy Cats. The album was produced by John Lennon, who had been ejected from The Troubadour with Nilsson for drunkenly heckling a Smothers Brothers performance several days before Moon's arrival. The three, along with Ringo Starr (who also drummed on Pussy Cats), Lennon's girlfriend May Pang, bassist Klaus Voormann, Voormann's girlfriend Cynthia Webb, and Starr's manager Hilary Gerrard, moved together into a Santa Monica beach house for three weeks. The sessions were affected by Lennon, Nilsson, Moon and Starr's excessive lifestyles and drug abuse, ultimately prompting Lennon to relocate the sessions to New York City to separate himself and Nilsson from the Los Angeles party scene.

At the time of Moon's arrival, Lennon had made initial recordings for Rock 'n' Roll (1975) with Phil Spector, and David Bowie and Bryan Ferry had also released cover albums; Bowie's Pin Ups (1973) notably included two songs by the Who, "I Can't Explain" and "Anyway, Anyhow, Anywhere". Encountering the Beatles' former road manager Mal Evans on the Sunset Strip, Moon suggested that Evans produce a solo album for him.

Recording
The first song, a cover of The Beach Boys' "Don't Worry Baby", was recorded in late March at the Record Plant Studios, with musicians that included John Sebastian, Howard Kaylan and Mark Volman, Jesse Ed Davis, and Miguel Ferrer playing drums. Kaylan described the album as "a fantasy record for him", allowing him to live out his fantasy to "be a Beach Boy". For this reason, Moon largely avoided playing the drums, as he considered drumming his "job". Moon left Los Angeles on 19 April to begin filming Tommy, and after the filming concluded, unofficially relocated to California in August 1974, to work on the album proper. The album would be funded by a deal directly with Los Angeles' MCA Records arranged by Bill Curbishley and Peter Rudge, as funding was unavailable from London due to Track Records' legal problems with former Who managers Kit Lambert and Chris Stamp, and Moon's extravagant spending habits that led to reluctance to fund the sessions. Biographer Tony Fletcher expresses astonishment in Dear Boy: The Life of Keith Moon that MCA approved the album's recording and released the "travesty of a Beach Boys cover" as a single rather than rejecting the master tapes for "Don't Worry Baby".

Much like the difficulties that befell Pussy Cats and Rock 'n' Roll, the sessions for Two Sides of the Moon were affected by the "lazy and decadent self-indulgence that permeated the superstar scene of mid-seventies LA". The routine of inconsistent working hours and lengthy indulgence, particularly of alcohol and drugs, slowed down the sessions considerably; the atmosphere of the studio resembled that of a club. One of the album's engineers, Gary Ladinsky, recalled: "You'd get something done for an hour, and then it's a party scene. Eventually, you clear out the studio and you might do something for another half an hour, and then people wander out, and you realise, 'I guess the session is over.'" After "Teenage Idol", with Dick Dale guesting on guitar, was delivered to MCA, Evans was fired as producer, which Fletcher attributes to Moon's realisation that the sessions were largely fruitless and Evans' own drinking problem was worsening. He was replaced as producer by Skip Taylor, who was described by Volman and engineer John Stronach as the main provider of drugs for the sessions. Taylor did not dispute the assessment: "I would go in and decide, is this a night where we should have a little brandy, or should we smoke some stuff, or should we put a couple of lines out?" Most of the musicians involved saw no real difference as a result of the change. Kaylan commented that after recording his parts twice, "Basically it was the same record." Joe Walsh, who was then recording So What with Stronach at the Record Plant, was brought in to play additional guitar on "The Kids Are Alright" late in the sessions. He described the results as "semi-train wrecks" and expressed surprise that Moon had only used two producers since he would "fry" anyone who worked with him.

Moon's contributions to the album were primarily vocals. He only played drums on three songs, simultaneously accompanied by session drummers. Stronach said that the sessions had two drummers: "One to keep time and then Keith to play over it." The first set of vocals recorded with Evans was discarded, as all had been recorded while Moon was inebriated; Taylor characterised them as "a guy from England trying to sound like a guy from Nashville but having about five belts before he did it." Taylor demanded that Moon abandon the country twang in which he had sung the early songs (and which is noticeable on outtakes such as "I'm Not Angry"), and sing in the posh accent he regularly mimicked. Fletcher comments that so many musicians were brought in to try to "salvage" the record (sixty being credited on the final album, with several others such as Brian Wilson having been rumoured to have contributed as well) that it resulted in Moon sounding more like "the guest on someone else's record". Moon's behaviour during the sessions reflected his self-destructive lifestyle and worsening health. Recording vocals one night in Studio B under a low ceiling covered in spotlights, he smashed a light bulb with an ashtray every time recording was stopped because he failed to hit a note, ending up destroying the entire light fixture. Stronach recalled, "He'd come in, reach into his pockets, and there'd be pills and cocaine falling out." While Moon had previously been able to sing adequately on several songs from the A Quick One, Ready Steady Who and The Who Sell Out sessions, his strained and frequently off-key vocals on Two Sides of the Moon contributed to feelings of inadequacy and depression throughout recording.

MCA's then-president Mike Maitland told Taylor at their first meeting that a lot of money had been invested before he assumed production duties, and that MCA was "prepared to spend an enormous sum of money in promotion and marketing". This was exactly what happened: Fletcher states that "well over $200,000" was spent for "recording costs alone", and that Moon claimed to receive a non-returnable advance for the same amount. With the album being prepared for release in 1975, MCA initially refused to pay for the elaborate sleeve designed by Gary Stromberg. Moon, Taylor and Stronach went to meet with Maitland; Moon asked Taylor to stop in front of an Army and Navy store on the way, and returned with a fire axe, which he kept hidden on himself. Maitland once again denied their sleeve request, criticising them for the excessive cost of the album. Moon responded by placing himself directly in front of Maitland and held the fire axe above Maitland's mahogany partners desk, and said, "What's it going to be, dear boy? My album cover or a new desk?"

Content
Originally recorded for his own album, but not released on it, John Lennon gave Moon the track "Move Over Ms. L" and later did his own version. "Solid Gold", written by keyboardist Nickey Barclay, was originally recorded by her band Fanny.

Vinyl pressings of the Two Sides of the Moon had text etched into the run-out groove of side 1 that read "Grown Men Did This". The record itself was contained in an elaborate reversible inner sleeve that, when flipped, changed the front cover to show Moon's buttocks hanging from the limousine window, forming a pun on his name. 
Upon release, Moon subsequently started work on a second solo album, which was never completed. Two Sides of the Moon was re-released by Repertoire Records in 1997, including the finished songs that Moon had made for his second album. Two Sides of the Moon was again re-released by Castle Music and Sanctuary Records in July 2006, as a two-disc Deluxe Edition, featuring the original 10 songs plus 41 bonus tracks. 9788512

Critical reception 

Reviewing in Christgau's Record Guide: Rock Albums of the Seventies (1981), Robert Christgau said "It's hard to imagine the auteur of this alternately vulgar, silly, and tender travesty/tour de force as anyone but Keith Moon; his madness translates not only to film (Stardust, Tommy) but even to the supersolo studio jobs that this parodies so deliciously. I presume they thought it was funny to mix the backup singers (Nilsson, Nelson, Flo & Eddie) up in front of the guy with his name on the cover. And it was."

In a review for AllMusic, Steve Leggett said the album was "so fascinatingly bad that it has assumed a certain cult status" but was nevertheless "a horrible album on all counts."

The album was included in a list of 12 ill-advised solo albums, in an article produced by the NME in 2009.

Track listing
Side one
 "Crazy Like a Fox" (Al Staehely) – 2:07
 "Solid Gold" (Nickey Barclay) – 2:48
 "Don't Worry Baby" (Brian Wilson, Roger Christian) – 3:31
 "One Night Stand" (Dennis Larden) – 3:36
 "The Kids Are Alright" (Pete Townshend) – 3:03

Side two
 "Move Over Ms. L" (John Lennon) – 3:10
 "Teen Age Idol" (Jack Lewis) – 2:20
 "Back Door Sally" (John Marascalco) – 2:31
 "In My Life" (Lennon-McCartney) – 2:43
 "Together" (Harry Nilsson, Keith Moon, Richard Starkey) – 3:05

1997 bonus tracks
 "U.S. Radio Spot" (Moon, Richard Starkey)
 "I Don't Suppose" (Nickey Barclay)
 "Naked Man" (Randy Newman)
 "Do Me Good" (Steve Cropper)
 "Real Emotion" (Steve Cropper)
  "Don't Worry Baby" - U.S. single A-side (Brian Wilson, Roger Christian)
 "Teenage Idol" - U.S. single B-side (Jack Lewis)
 "Together 'Rap'" (Harry Nilsson, Moon, Richard Starkey)

2006 deluxe edition

Personnel 
Keith Moon – drums, percussion, vocals
Ringo Starr, Ricky Nelson, Harry Nilsson - vocals
Spencer Davis, Jesse Ed Davis, John Staehely, Beau Guss, Patti Quatro, Danny Kortchmar, James Haymer, John Sebastian, Steve Adamick, Al Staehely, Mike Condello, Paul Lenart – guitar
Joe Walsh – guitar, ARP synthesizer
Dick Dale – surf guitar on "Teenage Idol"
Skip Edwards – steel guitar, Fender Rhodes electric piano
Jimmie Randall, Paul Stallworth, Jean Millington, David Birkett, Klaus Voormann – bass guitar
Jay Ferguson, Nickey Barclay, Blair Aaronson, David Foster – piano
Norman Kurban – piano, organ
William "Curly" Smith, Cam Davis, Miguel Ferrer, Mickey McGee, Ron Grinel, Jim Keltner, Ringo Starr – drums
Robert Greenidge – steel drums on "Together"
Steve Douglas, Ollie Mitchell – horns on "Move Over Ms. L" and "Back Door Sally"
Bobby Keys – saxophone on "Back Door Sally"
Julia Tillman, Lorna Willard, Sherlie Matthews, Fanny, Clydie King, Howard Kaylan, Jim Gilstrap, Mark Volman, Flo & Eddie, Jay DeWitt White, Dennis Larden, Andra Willis, Augie Johnson, Carolyn Willis, Gerald Garrett, Gregory Matta, Ira Hawkins, Irma Routen, Ron Hicklin, Cam Davis – backing vocals
David Bowie – vocal contribution on "Real Emotion"
Jimmie Haskell – string arrangements, conductor
Mal Evans – horn arrangement on "Move Over Ms. L"

Technical
Don Wood, Gary Kellgren, Gary Ladinsky, John Stronach, Lee Kiefer, Michael Verdick, Mike Stone – engineer
Bruce Reiley, Gary Stromberg, John Stronach, Keith Moon, Skip Taylor – cover concept
George Osaki – art direction
Jim McCrary, Robert Failla – photography

Session information
Credits taken from the inner sleeve of the vinyl release.

"Crazy Like A Fox"
Written by Al Staehely
Keith Moon - lead vocals, drums
Curly Smith - drums
Jimmie Randall - bass
Spencer Davies and Al Staehely - acoustic guitars
John Staehely and Jesse Ed Davis - electric guitars
Jay Ferguson - piano
Sherlie Matthews, Lorna Willard, Julia Tillman - backing vocals

"Solid Gold"
Written by Nickey Barclay
Keith Moon - lead vocals
Ringo Starr - "announcer"
Cam Davis - drums
Paul Stallingworth and Jean Millington - bass
Nickey Barclay - piano
Patti Quatro - guitar
Joe Walsh - guitar, ARP synthesizer
Beau Guss - guitar solo
Sherlie Matthews, Lorna Willard, Julia Tillman, Fanny - backing vocals

"Don't Worry Baby"
Written by Brian Wilson and Roger Christian
String arrangement and conducting by Jimmy Haskell
Keith Moon - lead vocals, percussion
Miguel Ferrer - drums
Paul Stallingworth - bass
John Sebastian, Steve Adamick, Danny Kortchmar, Jesse Ed Davis, James Haymer - acoustic guitars
Norman Kurban - organ
Blair Aaronson - piano
Sherlie Matthews, James Gilstrap, Clydie King, Flo & Eddie - backing vocals

"One Night Stand"
Written by Dennis Larden
Keith Moon and Rick Nelson - co-lead vocal
Mickey McGee - drums
David Birkett - bass
Mike Condello and Al Staehely - acoustic guitars
Joe Walsh - electric guitar
Skip Edwards - Fender Rhodes, pedal steel guitar
Dennis Larden, Jay White, Flo & Eddie - backing vocals

"The Kids Are Alright"
Written by Pete Townshend
String arrangement and conducting by Jimmy Haskell
Keith Moon - lead vocals, drums, drum solo
Curly Smith - drums
Jimmie Randall - bass
Al Staehely - acoustic guitar
John Staehely - electric guitar
Joe Walsh - electric guitar, ARP synthesizer
Jay Ferguson - piano
Flo & Eddie - backing vocals

"Move Over Ms. L"
Written by John Lennon
Horn arrangement by Mal Evans
Keith Moon - lead vocals, drums
Ron Grinel - drums
Paul Stallingworth - bass
Joe Walsh - lead guitar
Jesse Ed Davis - guitar
David Foster - piano
Ollie Mitchell, Steve Douglas - horns

"Teenage Idol"
Written by Jack Lewis
String arrangement and conducting by Jimmy Haskell
Keith Moon - lead vocals
Jim Keltner - drums
Paul Stallingworth - bass
Dick Dale - surf guitar and solo
Dan Kortchmar - acoustic guitar
Jesse Ed Davis - electric guitar
Norman Kurban - piano
Jay White, Dennis Larden - backing vocals

"Back Door Sally"
Written by John Marascalco
Keith Moon - lead vocals
Curly Smith - drums
Jimmie Randall - bass
Al Staehely, Joe Walsh - electric guitar
Jay Ferguson, Blair Aaronson - piano
Bobby Keys - sax solo
Ollie Mitchell, Steve Douglas - horns
Flo & Eddie - backing vocals

"In My Life"
Written by John Lennon and Paul McCartney
String arrangement and conducting by Jimmy Haskell
Keith Moon - lead vocals
Norman Kurban - piano
Choir:
Gerald Garrett
James Gilstrap
Ira Hawkins
Ron Hicklin
August Johnson
Clydie King
Greg Matta
Irma Routen
Julia Tillman
Lorna Willard
Andra Willis
Carolyn Willis

"Together"
Written by Harry Nilsson
String arrangement and conducting by Jimmy Haskell
Keith Moon - lead vocals
Ringo Starr - drums and "rap"
Jim Keltner - drums
Klaus Voormann - bass
Jesse Ed Davis, Danny Kortchmar, Paul Lenart - guitars
Robert Greenidge - steel drums
Harry Nilsson - backing vocals

References

External links
Press release (Archived version) for the 2006 Deluxe Edition

1975 debut albums
Keith Moon albums
Albums arranged by Jimmie Haskell
Albums produced by Steve Cropper
MCA Records albums
Polydor Records albums